Wallace Ernest Orchard (August 20, 1890 – June 2, 1917) was a Canadian amateur ice hockey left wing who played for Montreal AAA.

Military service
On January 18, 1916, a year and a half after the outbreak of the First World War, Orchard enlisted in the Royal Naval Air Service. He was noted as a "good steady pilot" and was commissioned as a temporary flight sub-lieutenant in August. 

On June 2, 1917, Orchard, stationed with No. 3 Squadron on the Western Front, took off in a Sopwith Pup biplane to intercept German aircraft reported in the area. While mounting an attack on one German plane, he was wounded in the face and subsequently returned to his squadron's airfield. The severely wounded Orchard was recovered and transported to No. 1 Field Dressing Station at Beugny, then to the 29th Casualty Clearing Station in Grévillers, where he died of his wounds. Orchard is buried at the Grevillers British Cemetery.

Career statistics

References

1890 births
1917 deaths
People from Saint-Lambert, Quebec
Canadian ice hockey left wingers
Montreal Hockey Club players
Montreal Victorias players
Royal Naval Air Service aviators
Royal Navy officers of World War I
Royal Naval Air Service personnel of World War I
British military personnel killed in World War I
Aviators killed in aviation accidents or incidents in France
Victims of aviation accidents or incidents in 1917